Volkhov is a town in Volkhovsky District of Leningrad Oblast, Russia.

Volkhov may also refer to:
Volkhov (inhabited locality), other localities in Russia by this name
Volkhov (river), a river in north-western Russia
Volkhov Hydroelectric Station, a hydroelectric station in Russia
Volkhov Front, a military subdivision of the Red Army in World War II in northwestern Russia
Soviet battleship Volkhov, an artillery ship of the Soviet Baltic Fleet (1950-1953)
SA-75 “Volkhov” a Soviet Surface to Air Missile system.

See also
Volkhv, a priest in pre-Christian Rus'